Kingston is a Canadian community in Kings County, New Brunswick.  The village centre is located at the intersection of New Brunswick Routes 845 and 850. The square features a school, church, and a general store built in 1788. The MacDonald Consolidated School also houses a museum. There is also a popular farmers market in Kingston which draws buyers from such areas as Quispamsis and Rothesay, New Brunswick.

History

Located on the Kingston Peninsula, the village was settled in 1783 by Loyalists at the conclusion of the American Revolution.

The Kings County Gaol was once located in the community but it was moved to nearby Hampton one stone at a time. The famous horse thief Henry More Smith once escaped from the jail.

See also
 Royal eponyms in Canada
 Ministers Face - local cliff face

Notable people

See also
List of communities in New Brunswick

References

 Kingston Farmers Market

Communities in Kings County, New Brunswick